Praha-Bubny is a railway station located in Prague 7 in the Holešovice cadastral area. Although today it is only served by local trains and with limited passenger facilities, it is one of the largest stations in Prague by area, with 20 tracks and 6 platforms. It is located on track 120, leading from Prague to Kladno. On the northern edge of the station yard, a small halt named Praha-Holešovice zastávka serves trains on track 091 from Prague to Kralupy nad Vltavou. The station is not served directly by any trams or buses, but is 5 minutes walking distance from the tram system and 10 minutes from Vltavská metro station. It is also located a short distance south from the more mainline Praha-Holešovice station.

In 2023, renovation work began on a section of the Prague–Kladno line including Praha–Bubny station.

Services

Praha-Bubny

Praha-Holešovice zastávka

References
 Praha-Bubny (Želpage)
 Praha-Holešovice zastávka (Želpage)

Citations

Bubny
Railway stations opened in 1868
Prague 7